Looker Data Sciences, Inc. is an American computer software company headquartered in Santa Cruz, California. It was acquired by Google in 2019 and is now part of the Google Cloud Platform. Looker markets a data exploration and discovery business intelligence platform.

History 
The company was founded in Santa Cruz, California in January, 2012 by Lloyd Tabb and Ben Porterfield and occupied the historic Rittenhouse building there. The product grew out of Tabb's experience building software at companies like Netscape, LiveOps, and Luminate before founding Looker.

Looker makes use of a simple modeling language called LookML that lets data teams define the relationships in their database so business users can explore, save, and download data with only a basic understanding of SQL.
The product was the first commercially available business intelligence platform built for and aimed at scalable or massively parallel relational database management systems like Amazon Redshift, Google BigQuery, HP Vertica, Netezza, and Teradata.

On August 13, 2013, Looker announced a Series A round of funding from Redpoint Ventures, First Round Capital, and PivotNorth Capital, raising more than $18M. Prior to the Series A round, Looker raised $2M in a seed round from First Round Capital and PivotNorth Capital. On March 11, 2015, Looker raised $30M in series B funding. In July, 2015, Jen Grant joined as chief marketing officer, and the company estimated it has 140 employees. On January 14, 2016, Looker raised $48M in series C funding from Kleiner Perkins. At that time, the company estimated 450 customers, including Jet.com. On March 30, 2017, Looker raised $81.5M in series D funding led by Capital G. On December 6, 2018, Looker raised $103M in series E funding led by Premji Invest. On June 21, 2016, Looker celebrated the release of Winning With Data, a book coauthored by Looker CEO, Frank Bien and Redpoint Partner, Tomasz Tunguz.

On June 6, 2019, Google announced it was acquiring Looker for $2.6 billion. The acquisition was finalized February 2020.

In March 2022, Looker's CEO - Frank Bien - announced his departure from the company.

Under Google Cloud Platform 
The Looker Platform for Data operates today as a part of Google Cloud Platform and offers a wide variety of tools for relational database work, business intelligence, and other related services. Looker's 2019 revenue is estimated to be about $140 million.

References

External links 
 

Data visualization software
Business intelligence software
Google acquisitions
Business intelligence companies
2020 mergers and acquisitions
Business services companies established in 2012
Software companies established in 2012
Software companies based in California
Data warehousing products
Companies based in Santa Cruz, California
2012 establishments in California
Defunct software companies of the United States
Google Cloud
Business services companies disestablished in the 21st century
Business analysis
Big data companies